Beautiful View is the seventh studio album released by Australian singer Wendy Matthews released by BMG in Australia on 7 May 2001. It yielded three singles "Free", "Beautiful View" and "Like the Sun".

Matthews wrote the majority of the album on the north coast of New South Wales, Australia. She chose the name "Beautiful View" for the album because she wanted to "link it [the album] to this special place where I can look to the islands in winter and watch the whales frolicking in the ocean."

Track listing

 "Like the Sun" (Matthews, R. Reid, Michael Szumowski) – 4:16
 "Free" (S. Peiken, G. Wells) – 3:54
 "Beautiful View" (Greg Arnold, Cameron McKenzie) – 2:57
 "Hollow Boy" (Matthews, Reid, Szumowski) – 4:08
 "Roll Away the Stone" (Matthews, Reid, Szumowski) – 3:28
 "No Vacancy" (Matthews, G. Skinner) – 4:27
 "Maybe" – 3:52
 "Right Now" – 3:38
 "Waiting" (Mark Duffy) – 4:17
 "Unravelling" – 4:45
 "My Boy Before" (Paul Kelly, Matthews, Szumowski) – 4:27

Bonus CD
 "I've Got to Have You" (3AM mix) – 4:14
 "These Streets" (Sorry's mix) – 5:02
 "Day by Day" (Last Suppers mix) – 4:56
 "If Only I Could" (Timebomb mix) – 5:45
 "Beautiful View"  (View from Ashfield mix) – 4:32

Charts

References

2001 albums
Wendy Matthews albums